Chain Aye Na ( meaning "State of Restlessness") is a 2017 Pakistani Romance film  written and directed by Syed Noor. The film received negative reviews from critics and was a critical and commercial failure, and suffered a poor performance at the box office. It was an unofficial remake of the 1986 Pakistani film Beqarar starring Babra Sharif and Faisal Rehman.

Plot
The movie follows Rayyan (Shehroz Subzwari), a young musician who falls in love with Ruba (Sarish Khan) at first sight. Ruba has no interest in Rayyan as she is happily engaged to Murad.

Cast
 Shehroz Sabzwari as Rayyan
 Sarish Khan as Ruba
 Adil Murad as Murad
 Nadeem Baig 
 Behroze Sabzwari 
 Mustafa Qureshi 
 Atiqa Odho 
 Danish Nawaz 
 Waqar Godhra
 Sobia Khan
 Mariam Saleem

Release
The film was released on 11 August 2017 in Pakistan, the Gulf States, China, the United States, and Canada.

References

External links
 
 

Remakes of Pakistani films
2017 films
Films scored by M Arshad
Lollywood films
2010s Urdu-language films
2017 in Pakistani cinema
2017 romantic drama films
Pakistani romantic drama films
Films directed by Syed Noor